Desmond Fitzgerald (born 20 December 1957 in Dublin) is a former Irish rugby union international player who played for the Irish national rugby union team. He played as a prop forward.
He played for the Ireland team from 1984 to 1992, winning 34 caps, after making his debut in February 1984 against England in a 12–9 defeat at Twickenham. 
He played in two Rugby World Cups: 1987 and 1991.
He is the father of Irish International rugby player Luke Fitzgerald.

Des was also an excellent GAA football player and he won a schools final while playing for De La Salle Rathfarnham National School in Croke Park in 1968.

His son Luke is also a former Irish rugby union player who played as a winger or fullback for Leinster Rugby and Ireland national rugby union team.

References

External links

1957 births
Living people
Irish rugby union players
Ireland international rugby union players
British & Irish Lions rugby union players from Ireland
Rugby union players from Dublin (city)
Rugby union props